Kelloggsville may refer to:

Kelloggsville, New York
Kelloggsville, Ohio

See also
Kelloggsville Public Schools